Wembezi Stadium is a multi-use stadium in Estcourt, KwaZulu-Natal, South Africa. It is currently used mostly for football matches and is the home venue of Wembezi Juventus in the Vodacom League.

Sports venues in KwaZulu-Natal
Soccer venues in South Africa